The 2021 NCAA Division I men's basketball tournament was a single-elimination tournament of 68 teams to determine the National Collegiate Athletic Association (NCAA) Division I men's college basketball national champion for the 2020–21 season. The 82nd edition of the tournament began play on March 18, 2021 in sites around the state of Indiana, and concluded with the championship game at Lucas Oil Stadium in Indianapolis on April 5, with the Baylor Bears defeating the previously undefeated Gonzaga Bulldogs 86–70 to earn the team's first ever title.

For logistical considerations surrounding the ongoing COVID-19 pandemic (which resulted in the cancellation of the previous year's tournament), the NCAA announced in January 2021 that all tournament games would be held in Indiana rather than at sites across the country. This was the first (and only) time in the history of the tournament that a single state has hosted it in its entirety.

This marked the first time since 1976 that neither Duke nor Kentucky qualified for the tournament. It was also the first time since 1995 that Duke failed to make the tournament, breaking a streak of 24 consecutive appearances. America East champion Hartford and WAC champion Grand Canyon made their NCAA Tournament debuts.

The tournament was marked by many upsets, with Yahoo Sports journalist Pete Thamel calling it "one of the most dizzying NCAA men's tournaments in history". With only half of the 16 second-round games having been played, there had been 11 upsets to that point, using the NCAA's definition of "upset" as a win by a team seeded five or more lines below its defeated opponent. This had already broken the record for most upsets prior to the round of 16; by the end of the second round, this number went up to 12. In addition, at least one 9, 10, 11, 12, 13, 14, and 15 seed won a first-round game for the fourth time ever, and the first time since 2016. Also, a record four teams seeded 13 or lower won first-round games. Another notable mark set during the tournament was a record-breaking 14 upsets throughout the event, breaking the original record of 13 upsets from the 1985 and 2014 tournaments.

The Final Four game between UCLA and Gonzaga (the first semifinal game to go into overtime since 1998) saw a game-winning buzzer-beater by Jalen Suggs to take Gonzaga into the championship game, the first buzzer-beater in a national semifinal since 1977. By defeating Gonzaga in the championship game, the Baylor Bears became the second consecutive first-time NCAA champions, following the Virginia Cavaliers in 2019. The last time this happened was in 2002 and 2003, when the Maryland Terrapins and Syracuse Orange (then nicknamed Orangemen) won their first titles in their respective years. Baylor also joined Texas Western (now known as the University of Texas at El Paso) as the only two teams from the state of Texas to have won an NCAA Division I Basketball championship, the Miners having done so in 1966.

Tournament procedure

	
A total of 68 teams entered the 2021 tournament, with 31 of them (down from 32, due to the Ivy League having canceled all winter semester sports due to COVID-19) having received an automatic bid by winning their conference's tournament. The remaining 37 bids were "at-large", with selections extended by the NCAA Selection Committee. Teams met sport sponsorship requirements and were considered for NCAA championship selection if they played 13 games, which represented a 50 percent reduction of the current minimum. For NCAA championship consideration, all 13 games had to be against other Division I opponents. Teams could also play 12 regular-season games against Division I opponents and one conference tournament game to be eligible for tournament consideration.

The Selection Committee seeded the entire field from 1 to 68. The four lowest-seeded automatic qualifiers and the four lowest-seeded at-large teams played in the First Four round: for the 2021 tournament, the games were played between the overall 65th and 66th seeds, the 67th and 68th seed, and the last four at-large seeds.

The top four teams outside of the ranking (commonly known as the "first four out" in pre-tourney analyses) acted as standbys in the event a school was forced to withdraw from the tournament due to COVID-19 protocols. However, if a team withdrew within 48 hours of the tournament's commencement, they would not be replaced; the bracket was not reseeded, and the affected team's opponent would automatically advance to the next round.

Schedule and venues

On January 4, 2021, the NCAA announced that due to logistical considerations associated with the COVID-19 pandemic (which prompted the cancellation of the 2020 tournament), the entirety of the tournament would be conducted at sites  within the Indianapolis metro area and central Indiana, rather than across the country. Players stayed at hotels near the Indiana Convention Center, which served as the main practice facility.

On February 19, it was announced that all venues would operate at a maximum of 25% capacity. As this capacity includes staff and players, the exact number of spectators varied by venue. Artificial crowd noise was used at all venues to augment the limited in-person attendance.

This tournament marked the first time ever that Indiana Farmers Coliseum was a tournament venue, the first time since 2017 that Bankers Life Fieldhouse was a tournament venue, the first time since 1940 that Hinkle Fieldhouse was a tournament venue, the first time since 1980 that Mackey Arena was a tournament venue, and the first time since 1981 that Assembly Hall was a tournament venue.

First Four:

 Thursday, March 18
 Mackey Arena, West Lafayette, Indiana (Host: Purdue University)
 Simon Skjodt Assembly Hall, Bloomington, Indiana (Host: Indiana University Bloomington)

First and Second Rounds:
 Friday, March 19 and Saturday, March 20
 Mackey Arena, West Lafayette, Indiana (Host: Purdue University)
 Simon Skjodt Assembly Hall, Bloomington, Indiana (Host: Indiana University Bloomington)
 Bankers Life Fieldhouse, Indianapolis, Indiana (Host: Ball State University)
 Hinkle Fieldhouse, Indianapolis, Indiana (Host: Butler University)
 Indiana Farmers Coliseum, Indianapolis, Indiana (Host: IUPUI)
 Lucas Oil Stadium, Indianapolis, Indiana (Two Courts) (Unity And Equality) (Hosts: IUPUI/Horizon League)
 Sunday, March 21 and Monday, March 22
 Bankers Life Fieldhouse, Indianapolis, Indiana (Host: Ball State University)
 Hinkle Fieldhouse, Indianapolis, Indiana (Host: Butler University)
 Indiana Farmers Coliseum, Indianapolis, Indiana (Host: IUPUI)
 Lucas Oil Stadium, Indianapolis, Indiana (Two Courts) (Unity And Equality) (Hosts: IUPUI/Horizon League)

Regional Semifinals and Finals (Sweet Sixteen and Elite Eight):

 Saturday, March 27 and Sunday, March 28
 Bankers Life Fieldhouse, Indianapolis, Indiana (Host: Ball State University) 
 Hinkle Fieldhouse, Indianapolis, Indiana (Host: Butler University)
 Monday, March 29 and Tuesday, March 30
 Lucas Oil Stadium, Indianapolis, Indiana (Two Courts) (Unity And Equality) (Hosts: IUPUI/Horizon League)

National Semifinals and Championship (Final Four and Championship):

 Saturday, April 3 and Monday, April 5
 Lucas Oil Stadium, Indianapolis, Indiana (Hosts: IUPUI/Horizon League)

Original 2021 NCAA Tournament schedule and venues

The following sites were originally selected to host each round of the 2021 tournament; with the exceptions of Boise and Minneapolis, all cities and venues listed are scheduled to host tournament games after 2021:

First Four
 March 16 and 17
 University of Dayton Arena, Dayton, Ohio (Host: University of Dayton)

First and Second Rounds
 March 18 and 20
 Dunkin' Donuts Center, Providence, Rhode Island (Host: Providence College)
 ExtraMile Arena, Boise, Idaho (Host: Boise State University)
 Little Caesars Arena, Detroit, Michigan (Hosts: University of Detroit Mercy/Oakland University)
 American Airlines Center, Dallas, Texas (Host: Big 12 Conference)
 March 19 and 21
 Intrust Bank Arena, Wichita, Kansas (Host: Wichita State University)
 Rupp Arena, Lexington, Kentucky (Host: University of Kentucky)
 PNC Arena, Raleigh, North Carolina (Host: North Carolina State University)
 SAP Center, San Jose, California (Host: West Coast Conference)

Regional Semifinals and Finals (Sweet Sixteen and Elite Eight)
 March 25 and 27
Midwest Regional, Target Center, Minneapolis, Minnesota (Host: University of Minnesota, Twin Cities)
West Regional,  Ball Arena, Denver, Colorado (Host: Mountain West Conference)
 March 26 and 28
South Regional, FedExForum, Memphis, Tennessee (Host: University of Memphis)
East Regional, Barclays Center, Brooklyn, New York (Host: Atlantic 10 Conference)

National Semifinals and Championship (Final Four and Championship)
 April 3 and 5
Lucas Oil Stadium, Indianapolis, Indiana (Hosts: IUPUI/Horizon League)

Qualification and selection

Automatic qualifiers

Tournament seeds

The tournament seeds and regions were determined through the NCAA basketball tournament selection process.

In contrast to previous years, the S-Curve used to establish overall seeds will also be used as primary determinant of the tournament bracket; this was made possible by the relatively condensed locations of this year's tournament making geographic concerns irrelevant. However, rules that can modify pairings to avoid early rematches and to distribute top conference representatives to different regions will remain in effect.

*See First Four

Tournament bracket
* – Denotes overtime period

Note: Unlike past tournaments, teams are not grouped as pods. Second round games will match teams that played at different venues in the first round.

First Four – Bloomington and West Lafayette
The First Four games involved eight teams: the four overall lowest-ranked teams, and the four lowest-ranked at-large teams.

West Regional

West Regional Final

West Regional all tournament team
 Drew Timme, Gonzaga (MOP)
 Corey Kispert, Gonzaga
 Evan Mobley, USC 
 Isaiah Mobley, USC 
 Jalen Suggs, Gonzaga

East Regional

East Regional Final

East Regional all tournament team
 Johnny Juzang, UCLA (MOP)
 Chaundee Brown Jr., Michigan
 Tyger Campbell, UCLA
 Hunter Dickinson, Michigan
 Jaime Jaquez Jr., UCLA

South Regional

South Regional Final

South Regional all tournament team
 Davion Mitchell, Baylor (MOP)
 Max Abmas, Oral Roberts
 Jared Butler, Baylor
 Jalen Tate, Arkansas
 MaCio Teague, Baylor

Midwest Regional

Midwest Regional Final

Midwest Regional all tournament team
 DeJon Jarreau, Houston (MOP)
 Quentin Grimes, Houston
 Cameron Krutwig, Loyola Chicago
 Marcus Sasser, Houston
 Ethan Thompson, Oregon State

Final Four – Indianapolis, Indiana

National semifinals

National championship

Final Four all-tournament team
 Jared Butler, Baylor (MOP)
 Johnny Juzang, UCLA
 Davion Mitchell, Baylor
 Jalen Suggs, Gonzaga
 Drew Timme, Gonzaga
Source:

Game summaries and tournament notes

Upsets
Per the NCAA, "Upsets are defined as when the winner of the game was seeded five or more places lower than the team it defeated." The 2021 tournament saw a record total of 14 upsets; 7 of them were in the first round, 5 of them were in the second round, and one of them in the Sweet Sixteen and Elite Eight, respectively.

Record by conference

 Includes a game declared no-contest due to COVID-19 protocols with VCU. Oregon of the Pac-12 conference advanced to the second round and VCU of the Atlantic 10 conference was eliminated from the tournament.

 The FF, R64, R32, S16, E8, F4, CG, and NC columns indicate how many teams from each conference were in the First Four, Round of 64 (first round), Round of 32 (second round), Regional semifinals (Sweet 16), Regional Finals (Elite Eight), National semifinals (Final Four), National Championship Game, and national champion, respectively.
 The Record column does not include wins or losses in games declared no-contest.

Media coverage

Television
CBS Sports and Turner Sports had US television rights to the tournament. As part of a cycle that began in 2016, CBS televised the 2021 Final Four and the national championship game. Because the 2020 tournament had been cancelled due to COVID-19 concerns, the last two rounds in back-to-back editions were broadcast on CBS for the first time since 2015 (TBS would have broadcast the 2020 Final Four and National Championship according to the arrangement).

Television channels
First Four – truTV and TBS
First and Second Rounds – CBS, TBS, TNT, and truTV
Regional semifinals and Final (Sweet Sixteen and Elite Eight) – CBS and TBS
National semifinals (Final Four) and championship – CBS

Studio hosts
 Greg Gumbel (New York City and Indianapolis) – First Four, first round, second round, Regionals, Final Four and National Championship Game
 Ernie Johnson (Atlanta and Indianapolis) – First Four, first round, second round, Regionals and Final Four
 Adam Zucker (New York City) – First round and Second round
 Matt Winer (Atlanta) – First round (Game Breaks)

Studio analysts
 Charles Barkley (Atlanta and Indianapolis) – First Four, first round, second round, Regionals, Final Four and National Championship Game
 Seth Davis (New York City and Indianapolis) – First Four, first round, second round, Regionals, Final Four and National Championship Game
 Jim Jackson (Indianapolis) – National Championship Game
 Andy Katz (Atlanta) – First Four, first round, second round and Regionals
 Clark Kellogg (New York City and Indianapolis) – First Four, first round, second round, Regionals, Final Four and National Championship Game
 Candace Parker (Indianapolis) – Final Four
 Kenny Smith (Atlanta and Indianapolis) – First Four, first round, second round, Regionals, Final Four and National Championship Game
 Gene Steratore (New York City and Indianapolis) (Rules Analyst) – First Four, first round, second round, Regionals, Final Four and National Championship Game
 Wally Szczerbiak (New York City) – First Four, first round, second round and Regionals

Commentary teams
 Jim Nantz/Bill Raftery/Grant Hill/Tracy Wolfson – First round at Hinkle Fieldhouse; Second Round and Regional Semi-finals at Bankers Life Fieldhouse (Sunday); South Regional Final at Lucas Oil Stadium Unity (South); Final Four and National Championship at Lucas Oil Stadium
 Hill joined Nantz, Raftery and Wolfson during the Regionals, Final Four and National Championship Games.
 Brian Anderson/Jim Jackson/Allie LaForce – First Four at Mackey Arena; First and Second Rounds at Bankers Life Fieldhouse; Regional Semi-finals at Hinkle Fieldhouse (Saturday); West Regional Final at Lucas Oil Stadium Unity (South)
 Ian Eagle/Grant Hill or Jim Spanarkel/Jamie Erdahl – First round at Mackey Arena; Second Round and Regional Semi-finals at Hinkle Fieldhouse (Sunday); Midwest Regional Final at Lucas Oil Stadium Equality (North)
 Hill called the First & Second Rounds, Spanarkel did the Regionals.
 Kevin Harlan/Dan Bonner/Dana Jacobson – First round at Indiana Farmers Coliseum; Second Round at Hinkle Fieldhouse; Regional Semi-finals at Bankers Life Fieldhouse (Saturday); East Regional Final at Lucas Oil Stadium Equality (North)
 Brad Nessler/Steve Lavin/Avery Johnson (First Four only)/Evan Washburn – First Four at Assembly Hall; First and Second Rounds at Indiana Farmers Coliseum
 Spero Dedes/Brendan Haywood/Lauren Shehadi – First round at Bankers Life Fieldhouse; Second Round at Lucas Oil Stadium Unity (South)
 Andrew Catalon/Steve Lappas/AJ Ross – First and Second Rounds at Hinkle Fieldhouse
 Carter Blackburn/Debbie Antonelli/Evan Washburn (Friday)/Dana Jacobson (Saturday)/Lauren Shehadi (Monday) – First round at Assembly Hall; Second Round at Hinkle Fieldhouse
 Lisa Byington/Steve Smith/AJ Ross (Friday & Sunday)/Lauren Shehadi (Saturday) – First round at Lucas Oil Stadium Unity (South); Second Round at Indiana Farmers Coliseum
 Tom McCarthy/Avery Johnson/AJ Ross (Friday)/Lauren Shehadi (Saturday) – First round at Lucas Oil Stadium Equality (North)
ESPN International had international rights to the tournament. Coverage used CBS/Turner play-by-play teams until the Final Four.

 Sean McDonough/Jay Bilas or Dick Vitale - Final Four and National Championship at Lucas Oil Stadium
Bilas did UCLA vs. Gonzaga, Vitale did Houston vs. Baylor and the National Championship Game

Most-watched tournament games

Radio

First Four
Ted Emrich and Kyle Macy – at Assembly Hall
John Sadak and Jordan Cornette – at Mackey Arena

First and Second Rounds
Ryan Radtke and Austin Croshere – at Hinkle Fieldhouse and Indiana Farmers Coliseum
Kevin Kugler and P. J. Carlesimo – at Bankers Life Fieldhouse and Lucas Oil Stadium
Craig Way and Donny Marshall – at Indiana Farmers Coliseum and Hinkle Fieldhouse
Ted Emrich and Kyle Macy – at Assembly Hall
John Sadak and Jordan Cornette – at Mackey Arena
Bill Rosinski and Will Perdue – at Lucas Oil Stadium and Bankers Life Fieldhouse
Jason Benetti and Robbie Hummel – at Lucas Oil Stadium, Bankers Life Fieldhouse and Hinkle Fieldhouse
Brandon Gaudin and Dan Dickau – at Hinkle Fieldhouse and Bankers Life Fieldhouse
Dave Pasch and Danny Manning – at Bankers Life Fieldhouse and Hinkle Fieldhouse
Scott Graham and Jon Crispin – at Indiana Farmers Coliseum, Lucas Oil Stadium and Bankers Life Fieldhouse

Regionals
Ryan Radtke and Donny Marshall – at Bankers Life Fieldhouse (Saturday) and Hinkle Fieldhouse (Sunday)
Kevin Kugler and P. J. Carlesimo – at Hinkle Fieldhouse (Saturday), Bankers Life Fieldhouse (Sunday) and Lucas Oil Stadium (Monday & Tuesday)
Ryan Radtke and Robbie Hummel – at Lucas Oil Stadium (Monday & Tuesday)

Final Four and National Championship
Kevin Kugler, Jim Jackson, P. J. Carlesimo, and Jim Gray – Lucas Oil Stadium

Internet
FastBreak is an online-only program providing whiparound coverage of all tournament games similar to NFL RedZone during the first weekend. 
 Dave Briggs, Rex Chapman, Tony Delk (New York City)

See also
 2021 NCAA Division I women's basketball tournament

Notes

References

Ncaa tournament
NCAA Division I men's basketball tournament
Basketball in Indianapolis
2020s in Indianapolis
NCAA
NCAA
NCAA
NCAA Division I